Walnut Street Baptist Church is a church building in downtown Waterloo, Iowa, United States. It has also been known as Faith Temple Baptist Church.

Built in 1908, it was designed for its triangular lot by Waterloo architect Clinton P. Shockley. Although the main exterior materials are merely brick plus stone and concrete trim, the building reflects multiple architectural influences:The building exhibits the influence of a combination of contemporary architectural styles and trends of the early 20th century including the English Arts and Crafts movement and the Chicago School with minor indications of the academic tradition of the Beaux-Arts.

Clinton Phillip Shockley began his architectural practice in 1906. This was an important work for him. He and Mortimer Cleveland were "by far" the most qualified architects in Iowa and were able to win contracts that would previously have gone to non-Iowa firms.

The Walnut Street Baptist Church congregation worshiped in the facility from its construction until 1970. The congregation was an early leader in the General Association of Regular Baptist Churches. Upon relocating to a new facility and changing its name to Walnut Ridge Baptist Church, the congregation sold the downtown site to Faith Temple Baptist Church (American Baptist Churches USA).

The building was individually listed on the National Register of Historic Places in 2000. In 2019 it was included as a contributing building in the Walnut Street Historic District.

References

External links

Churches completed in 1908
20th-century Baptist churches in the United States
Buildings and structures in Waterloo, Iowa
Baptist churches in Iowa
National Register of Historic Places in Black Hawk County, Iowa
Churches on the National Register of Historic Places in Iowa
1908 establishments in Iowa
Chicago school architecture in Iowa
Individually listed contributing properties to historic districts on the National Register in Iowa